Cavitaves is a clade that contain the order Leptosomiformes (cuckoo roller) and the clade Eucavitaves (a large assemblage of birds that includes woodpeckers, kingfishers and trogons). The name refers to the fact that the majority of them nest in cavities.

References

Neognathae